Pode Entrar is the sixth studio album by the Brazilian singer Ivete Sangalo released on June 5, 2009.

The album was recorded and videotaped in a studio set up at the singer's home in Salvador. The project depicts Sangalo in an intimate setting, entertaining friends at her house and collaborating with other high-profile Brazilian performers.

Guest artists include Maria Bethânia, Lulu Santos and Carlinhos Brown, Marcelo Camelo (leader of the band Los Hermanos) and group Aviões do Forró (represented by singers Alexandre Avião and Solange Almeida, the accordion player Valcir and drummer Pedro Riquelme), and Saulo Fernandes, Sangalo's friend and current leader of her former band Banda Eva.

The album sold over 300,000 copies in Brazil within 7 months of its release and spawned 4 singles:
"Cadê Dalila", "Agora Eu Já Sei", "Quanto Ao Tempo and the newest Na Base do Beijo".

Track listing

Charts

Certifications

References

2009 albums
Ivete Sangalo albums